Information and communication technology (ICT) in Kosovo has experienced a remarkable development since 1999. From being almost non-existent 10 years ago, Kosovar companies in the information technology (IT) domain offer today wide range of ICT services to their customers both local as well as to foreign companies. Kosovo has the youngest population in Europe, with advanced knowledge in ICT.

Today, public and private education institutions in the IT field, through certified learning curricula by companies such as CISCO and Microsoft, provide education to thousands of young Kosovars while the demand for this form of training is still rising.

Kosovo has two authorized mobile network operators and is the only country in the region not having awarded any UMTS license. Kosovo has neither awarded licenses for fixed wireless access, nor made the 900 and 1800 MHz bands technology neutral. Currently around 1,200,000 customers of "Vala" Post and Telecom of Kosovo (PTK). As of March 2007 the second GSM license granted to IPKO – Telekom Slovenije. Currently IPKO has over 1,000,000 users. Following the Brussels Agreement, Kosovo has its own telephone dialing code: 383. Before this assignment, network operators in Kosovo used either 387 (Monaco) or 386 (Slovenia). All other codes were to have been superseded by the new code on 15 January 2017, but some are still in use.

The infrastructure of ICT sector in Kosovo is mainly built of microwave network, optic and coaxial cable (DOCSIS). The telecom industry is liberalized and legislation is introduced adopting European unionregulatory principles and promoting competition. Some of the main internet providers are PTK, IPKO, Kujtesa and Artmotion.

History
First ICT companies in Kosovo can be found as early 1984, these companies where mainly focused on radio telecommunication and audio-video systems, while in early and mid '90s more companies were created, mainly specializing in personal computer sales. ICT industry in Kosovo boomed after 1999 with a lot of new companies being created, among which IPKO which now one of the major telecommunication providers and one of the biggest foreign investments in Kosovo.

Telecommunications

According to Regulatory Authority of Electronics and Postal Communication 2011 report, 86 telecommunication licenses have been issued since 2004.

Mobile Telephony
In 2010, 74 percent of the population was subscribed to mobile phone services, or a total number of 1,537,164 In 2007, PTK reported growth of subscribers from 300,000 to 800,000 in less than a year. In 2006, the number was 562,000.

You are required to show your ID to get a Sim card and pre-paid can be bought for 5 euros.
There are many shops selling used mobile phones and sim unlocking services. 

Two licensed Mobile network operators offer their services in competition with two MVNOs. The market, however, remains concentrated with the incumbent‟s mobile subsidiary controlling over 65% of the market. Mobile broadband services are not available as no UMTS licenses have been awarded. So far, there are no plans to carry out the re-farming of 900/1800 MHz bands or assign frequency spectrum for mobile broadband.

There are three virtual operators :
 D3 Mobile (virtual operator)-043 prefix
 Z Mobile  (virtual operator)-045 prefix
 Zog Mobile  (Powered by IPKO)-043 prefix

Fixed Telephony

Fixed telephony penetration rate is among the lowest in Europe about 5 lines per 100 inhabitants in 2011, in contrast with neighboring countries and European Union countries where penetration rates are 25% and 40% respectfully.

There are currently three licensed Fixed Telephony providers in Kosovo:

PTK
IPKO
KONET (leased lines)

PTK is by far the leading provider with market share of 94.4%, IPKO has only 5.6%. Number of subscribers dropped in 2011 to 86,014 from 88,372 in 2010, marking a drop of 2,358 or 2.67% of subscriber base.

Dialing Code
After the breakup of Yugoslavia, with dialing code 38, Kosovo used the Serbian dialing code, 381 for new and existing landlines. As mobile networks were introduced, PTK adopted the code 377 (Monaco) and IPKO adopted the code 386 (Slovenia). This situation resulted in the highly unusual simultaneous use of three international dialing codes.

In September 2012 the Assembly of Kosovo approved a resolution on replacing the various dialing codes in use with the Albanian country code 355. While this initiative draw a lot of media attention, it never saw the light of day.

In January 2016 after ongoing political discussions between Kosovo and Serbia, it was agreed that Kosovo would get its own country code: 383. This code is available for all mobile and fixed-line operators, all of whom were using other international telecom country code. The code 383 has now been formally assigned, and is in the process of adoption. This code was to have replaced all former codes on 15 January 2017, but the transition has yet to be complete.

Internet
Total of 38 licensed companies provide internet services in Kosovo, 6 of them with direct peering towards international gateways. Number of technologies are used to provide internet to end users, most popular being the cable DOCSIS technology with 68.95% of the market, followed by 25.43% xDSL and 5.62% other technologies like FTTX and wireless.

In contrast with other countries, majority of market share is owned by private operators, with a total of 74.57%. The biggest operator being IPKO with 51.21% followed by Kujtesa with 19.08% and PTK with 25.43%.

Others include:
 Artmotion
 ArdiNet
 OrangeNet
 I.T.S.
 ComNet
 NegeNet
 Telekom Srbija

Internet Penetration
Internet penetration in Kosovo is 96%.  Laptops are the most frequent device found in almost half of the Kosovo households (48%), followed by a computer (39%).  On average, households in Kosovo have a 20 Mbps download and 6 upload internet speed.

Vast majority of the Kosovo population (81%) use the internet every day, and the internet is used by the absolute majority (96%) of the Kosovo population at least at some occasion.  In addition, the internet usage is almost equally distributed across majority of age groups and is mostly used by students and employed people.

Internet is used three and a half hours daily on average by the Kosovo citizens.  Incomparably, mobile phones are the most frequent device (73%) used to access the internet.

A very important discovery of the research is that 93% of Kosovo citizens use the internet for communication.  All other reasons of usage are drastically lower compared to the communication.  Consequently, as well as related to the reasons why the internet is used mostly in terms of applications and webpages visited, communication platforms are used the most.

The vast majority of Kosovo citizens (98%) possess a mobile phone, and close to half of them (43%) possesses internet subscription on their phone.

Digital Television
Digital television transition is still an ongoing process in Kosovo, limiting the analog television broadcast domain to only three national channels. Due to this conditions all four major telecommunications companies in Kosovo now broadcast digital TV on other mediums. While IPKO and Kujtesa have chosen to reuse the existing coaxial network, PTK which offers xDSL services went for IPTV, Artomotion offers digital TV to selected users in Pristina.
IPKO has recently launched an IPTV solution, tailored towards mobile customers. Currently platform is available in iOS, Android and via a web browser.

Metro WiFi

Due to missing 3G/LTE licenses in Kosovo, and a growing demand for mobile broadband services from subscribers, both telecommunication providers PTK and IPKO turned to Municipal wireless network (Muni Wi-Fi). Both operators cover the majority of cities around Kosovo and touristic destinations like Prekaz and Brezovica, with more cities to be covered later.

Kosovo Internet Exchange Point

The Internet Exchange Point (KOSIX), the first of its kind in Kosovo, started operating on 23 June 2011, and it operates as a functional unit within Telecommunications Regulatory Authority (TRA). Its function is to provide the ISPs operating in Kosovo, an Internet exchange point for local traffic exchange.
Valuable and continuous contributions for the implementation of this project have given: United States Agency for International Development (USAID) offered throughout their program Kosovo Private Enterprise Program, Norwegian government offered through Ministry of Foreign Affairs and Norwegian embassy respectively, Cisco Systems International BV, and University of Prishtina which have offered adequate space within the buildings of Electrical and Computer Engineering Faculty.

Currently four national ISPs are interconnected via KOSIX, there is no cost for peering.

Economical aspects

ICT in Kosovo consists of relatively young companies (most of them incorporated after 1999) and with predominantly small companies with less than 20 employees.  53.8 percent of ICT companies are individual business while limited Liability Company (28.6 percent). Businesses specializing in maintenance and manufacturing are purely individual, while other sub-sectors are served by a mix of individual and LLC businesses. Other forms of incorporation are rare, with 4.4 percent being Limited Partnership, and 2.2 percent Joint-Stock Company. The rest (5.5) are either public companies or have the unusual status of NGOs.
Currently, the ICT companies are determined to grow and prosper within the Kosovo market, while very few companies seek expansion in markets outside Kosovo.

According to TRA report, ICT industry generated €239,518,037.36, 83.19 of which is generated by Mobile network operator, 8.37% from Fix telephony operators, 7.77% from Internet service providers and 0.68% from leased lines.

Market

The structure of the ICT market in Kosovo is diverse in the variety of activities, sales being the main activity 62 percent of the ICT companies have reported to import goods for retail, meanwhile their exports are minimal and their market share growth is seen to be within Kosovo, and could reach as far as North Macedonia and Albania. The average annual turnover in the sector is 250,000 euros, with an increasing number of companies reporting turnovers in millions of euros.

Sales - 33%
Retail Sales - 18.7%
Maintenance and Repair - 17.6%
Software Development - 13.2%
Consulting - 7.7
ISP - 7.7%
Training - 5.5%
Engineering Services - 4.4%

Ownership

The ICT sector is dominated by domestic firms. According to the survey, 80.2 percent of the respondents represented companies that are 100% domestically owned. Only 6.6 percent of the companies are entirely owned by foreigners. Mixed ownership is rare (3.3 percent). The other 3.3 percent that answered "Other" were either mostly owned by foreign companies or public/state-owned companies. Foreign investors are mostly present in the sub-sectors: consulting, information services, vendors, manufacturing/assembling, and retail.

Size and Employment

The majority of ICT companies is small.  More than three-quarters (77.1 percent) employ from one to twenty employees. Only a handful of the companies have more than 100 employees.  Most of the employees working in the ICT sector are male, leaving the female employees in a tiny minority. Around 19 percent of the companies do not have any female employees at all.  Over 93 per cent employ up to 10 women, 6 per cent of the firms employ between 11 and 20, and only 1.4 percent up to 30.  There is one large company which employs 230 female workers.

Average Salary

This list is a result of a survey conducted by USAID, Kosovo Private Enterprise Program with 829 ICT companies.

Kosovo Association of information and technology (STIKK)

According to statute, STIKK is a non-profit association founded and registered in accordance with the Law on Freedom of Association and Non-Governmental Organization. STIKK represents the interests of the information and communications technology of Kosova, and the interests of professionals in ITC industry.

Educational aspects
The increasing number of vacancies for ICT professionals in Kosovo is reflecting the increasing progress of the
industry, although thanks to the high quality of the university education of IT specialists, and the increasing interest
of young people in modern technologies, there are no signs of systematic shortages in ICT employment, except a
registered under-supply of specialists in the field of software development and programming. The number of ICT
graduates grows each year and the leader in providing the needed skills to the industry is the Faculty of Electrical
and Computer Engineering of the University of Pristina. ICT skilled professionals are also supplied by the
University for Business and Technology, the American University in Kosovo, as well as a few vocational education
providers.

According to the Kosovo Accreditation Agency there are currently 13 higher education institutions, public and private, accredited to offer ICT related study programs in their curricula.

The State University of Pristina 

Faculty of Electrical and Computer Engineering,
Faculty of Natural Sciences, Department of Computer Science,
Faculty of Applied Technical Sciences, Mitrovica.

The State University of Prizren 

Faculty of Computer Science.

Private Universities 

American University in Kosovo - has since 2003 an Information Technology program in bachelor studies,
University for Business and Technology - has an ICT related program both in bachelor and master studies.
AAB College https://aab-edu.net/ AAB College is the first non-public institution of higher education in Kosovo

Private Colleges 

AAB Riinvest - has an ICT related program - Software Engineering in bachelor studies, and also the same one in the master studies.
European College Dukagjini - has two bachelor programs related to ICT as of 2011: Management and Informatics, and Applied Informatics.
College Iliria - has two programs related to ICT: Management and Informatics, and Applied Informatics. Even though they have few master programs, none of them is related to ICT.
Vizioni Per Arsim has a bachelor program related to ICT:– Computer Science.

Other 

CACTTUS Education - since 2016 has a number of programs in systems and software engineering offering two year professional vocational Education in ICT
Professional training centers and academies (Cisco, Microsoft, ECDL, Oracle, RedHat etc.)
Universities abroad.

Legislation

For a short period Kosovo has managed to adopt few very important pieces of legislation and a strategic framework to support the government’s efforts to regulate, promote and improve the development of the ICT sector in Kosovo. Some of the most important legislative acts that have influenced the progress of the sector are:

Laws

Telecommunications law. – Adopted in 2002, the law governs all telecommunications services and all telecommunications service providers in Kosovo. The main objective of the Telecommunications law is to create a transparent legal and regulatory environment for the promotion of more investments in the sector and encourage competition.
Law on Information Society Services. – Approved in 2005 with the aim of enabling the legal use of electronic documentation, and facilitate the implementation of e-commerce, e-signature and personal data protection.
Law on Administrative Procedure – created to control the electronic implementation of the activities of public administration.
Law on Copyright and Related Rights.
Law on Scientific Research Activity.
Law on the Protection of Personal Data.
Law on Prevention and Fight against Cyber Crime.
Law for Privacy and Database Access.
Law on Digital Signatures
Postal Services Law

Strategic Framework

eSEE Agenda Plus for the Development of Information Society in SEE 2007-2012 - Kosovo is an active member of the regional eSEE Initiative - (Electronic South East Europe). The main objective of the initiative is to integrate SEE countries into the global, knowledge-based economy through development of the Information Society, in line with the European Union i2010 framework.
National Strategy for Information Society 2006-2012 – The Strategy was adopted by the Government of Kosovo in 2006.
Electronic Governance Strategy 2009-2015 – Published by the Department of Information Technology of the Ministry of Public Services of Kosovo in 2008, ensuring the provision of governmental institutions’ services through information technology and communication (WAN, Internet, mobile network) to citizens, businesses and others.
E-learning Strategy for Kosovo 2011 - 2015 – Prepared by the Ministry of Education, Science and Technology with the main objective to transform e-learning into an integral part of the overall national educational system.
Strategy for Development of Pre-university Education 2007–2017 – Adopted by the Ministry of Education, Science and Technology and used as a basis for the development of the education system of Kosovo.
Kosovo Education Strategic Plan 2011-2016 – Drafted in September 2010, the Strategic Plan is going to include eight priority programs among which are Capacity Building and Information and Communication Technology. The objective implemented in the ICT program is to fully develop and integrate ICT infrastructure and technical support needed to implement and sustain good educational practices.

Agencies

Regulatory Authority of Electronics and Postal Communication
Law on Telecommunications adopted by the Assembly and promulgated by UNMIK, Regulation 2003/16,recognizes the need to improve the telecommunications sector of Kosovo, by establishing an independent regulatory agency responsible for licensing and supervising the providers of telecommunications services in Kosovo, encouraging the private sector participation and competition in the provision of services; setting standards for all service providers in Kosovo, and, establishing provisions for consumer protection.
TRA officially started operating in January 2004.
During its young development TRA went through some important milestones that represented
a very important step towards a free, competitive market which promotes the development of the information society in Kosova.

Digital Divide

Age

Due to the overly young population in Kosovo, digital divide is not very notable, this phenomenon is more notable with people in their fifties and above. This problem was evident with the educational system as well, to address this Government of Kosovo organized an ECDL course for about 27000 teachers across Kosovo.

Gender
The labor force in the ICT sector is dominated by men with women comprising a marginal portion (although more significant in larger companies).

Location
Most ICT firms are based in the Pristina, the economic, political, and social center of the country, where most businesses are located and where there is the highest concentration of customers, as much as 81 percent of all ICT companies have Prishtina as their head office location.  The rest are fairly evenly spread out in the regional centers: Peja, Prizren, Gjilan, Gjakova, Podujeva, and Ferizaj.

Open source

Over the years there have been a number of open source organizations including Albanian Linux user group (AlbaLinux). Due to lack of support, most of them are now "passive"; among the most active and successful open source groups is Free Libre Open Source Software Kosova (FLOSSK).

Free Libre Open Source Software Kosova (FLOSSK)
FLOSSK began in March 2009 at the initiative of James Michael DuPont as a result of the desire to organize a conference on free and open software. After six difficult months and with the help of many supporters, FLOSSK organized the first conference of free and open software in Kosovo in August 2009.
Apart from the conference, FLOSSK continued to work in various activities such as organizing Software Freedom Days in different cities of Kosovo, lectures on free software throughout Kosovo, translating software, collaborating with the media to promote free software and creating local free software groups in various cities.
From the beginning, FLOSSK members and the general public learned about Linux operating system, FLOSS programs for solving everyday problems, map creation using OpenStreetMap, and met free software movement figures from around the world.

 Software Freedom Kosova
Software Freedom Kosova Conference is an annual conference on free and open source software and related developments in knowledge, culture and mapping held in Pristina, Kosovo. It is the largest conference of its kind in the region. The conference is organised by Free/Libre Open Source Software Kosova (FLOSSK), Kosovo Association of Information and Communication Technology, Ipko Foundation and Faculty of Electrical and Computer Engineering of the University of Prishtina.

Outsourcing

A case study on ICT training in Kosovo performed by CISCO Networking Academy (NetAcad) states that the educated and experienced workforce as a whole is searching higher salaries and better working conditions abroad. If graduates are not experienced, they stay for a while in Kosovo and when they have gained experience they start searching opportunities for migration.

It is exactly the findings that NetAcad case study revealed that make Kosovo a perfect ICT outsourcing country, and time difference with the USA makes it only more appealing for the U.S. market. Such is a story of 3CIS which provides highly specialized
services to major telecommunication carriers across the globe. This includes network architecture design, planning, consulting, implementation, integration and testing with a strong expertise on mobile backhauling. 3CIS also provides on-site consulting ser-
vices as well as manages and coordinates the activities in a multi-vendor environment during the life-cycle of the complete project. On top of this, 3CIS also offers Project management services that are tailored to suit client needs from initial planning to project completions.

Kosovo has made it to other markets as well, both individually as well as established companies. Sprigs is the best example of a Kosovar start-up company established in Pristina.
Anoniem is the highest-profile job to date for SPRIGS, which was founded in late 2010, by a Dutch entrepreneur, and this job was trusted to a half-dozen young Kosovar Albanian programmers, who work at computers at a repurposed apartment that now houses the technical brain trust of this IT outsourcing company.

See also

Economy of Kosovo
Education in Kosovo
American University in Kosovo
Universiteti i Prishtinës
University of Prizren
Media of Kosovo
Telecommunications in Albania

Notes

References

Further reading
History of IPKO
Let's Outsource in Kosovo
Dutch smartphone apps digitize wanted posters

External links
 Kosova Association of Information and Communication Technology
 Free Libre Open Source Software Kosova
 Regulatory Authority of Electronics and Postal Communication
 Kosovo Internet Exchange
 IPKO Foundation
 Innovation Centre Kosovo (ICK)
 Innovations Lab Kosovo
CACTTUS Education
Telecommunications Regulatory Authority (ART)

Science and technology in Kosovo
Telecommunications in Kosovo
Information technology by country
Kosovo